Dabatuy (Dabhatai) is a rural locality (an ulus) in Bichursky District, Republic of Buryatia, Russia. The population was 313 as of 2010. There are 5 streets.

Geography 
Dabatuy is located 46 km northeast of Bichura (the district's administrative centre) by road. Shibertuy is the nearest rural locality.

References 

Rural localities in Bichursky District